Rochelle "Rockie" Gardiner was an American astrologer. Her syndicated astrology column, The Rockie Horoscope, appeared in a variety of publications (mostly alternative weekly newspapers), on her own website, and she also gave custom astrological readings for individuals.

Biography 
She was born in 1938 in Brooklyn, New York, and raised in Lawrence, New York, on Long Island. Gardiner was a Sagittarius. She attended Syracuse University and graduated from Barnard College. 

Following graduation, she worked as an editor of children's books at Doubleday Publishing, along with Arthur Miller and Shirley Jackson.

In 1958, she married Peter Gardiner, a pioneering film director of psychedelic "pop films" that were predecessors to music videos. Peter and Rockie had a son, Jeremy, born in 1963 and in 1966 the small Gardiner family moved to Los Angeles, California, where Rockie discovered an interest in astrology. 

Peter died in 1968 and Rockie remained single the rest of her life. Rockie died unexpectedly following a brief illness on October 31, 2008, Halloween Day, at 11:11 a.m.

Rockie Horoscope astrology column 
Rockie's astrology column, The Rockie Horoscope, first appeared in the L.A. Weekly in 1983. Rockie typically wrote a general forecast for each weekday telling about the overall astrological influences and how they would affect a given day. She would also write a general forecast for the week ahead. These would be followed by weekly sign readings for the individual sun signs.

Her columns were known for their humor and wit. She frequently included pop-culture references to celebrities, politics, professional sports and pop music. Rockie famously predicted that U.S. President Ronald Reagan would die in office and that George H. W. Bush would assume the position, as well as that Jesse Jackson would be a vice-presidential candidate.

Sometimes, when she had not gotten around to updating her website, she would take down the old information and post the following message: "Rockie is soaking up atmosphere and astrological insight."

Newspapers that carried her column included: The Improper Bostonian, The L.A. Weekly, The Las Vegas Weekly, The O.C. Weekly, The Philadelphia Weekly and The Village Voice. It was even carried in Vogue magazine. In addition to her newspaper column and website, she also sold customized sign readings to individuals.

Sources 
 RIP Rockie Gardiner, Astrologer, by KateC, Published November 5, 2008, on Deep Glamour.net. Retrieved on November 11, 2008.
 Rockie Ascendant: A Farewell to Our Favorite Stargazer, by Jeremy Gardiner and Kristen Stavola, Published November 5, 2008, in the L.A. Weekly. Retrieved on November 11, 2008.
 Rockie Horoscope: From LoveToKnow Horoscopes by Rdube and Kelly Roper. Retrieved on November 11, 2008.

1938 births
2008 deaths
American astrologers
Barnard College alumni
20th-century astrologers
21st-century astrologers
People from Lawrence, Nassau County, New York